Daniela Munits (born 2007) is an Israeli rhythmic gymnast. She is the 2022 European junior ribbon champion.

Personal life 
Her twin Michelle is also a gymnast and won gold with ball at the European Championships in 2022.

Career 
Daniela competed at the 2021 Irina Deleanu Cup, finishing 15th in the All-Around and with hoop, 11th with ball, 19th with clubs and 20th with ribbon.

International tournament in Sofia, she was 31st in the All-Around, 17th with hoop, 5th with ribbon. In June she competed with ribbon at the European Championships in Tel Aviv along her twin, Alona Tal Franco, Lian Rona, the senior group and the individuals Daria Atamanov and Adi Asya Katz, where she won gold in teams and in the apparatus final. On November 26 she took part II edition of the international gala Viravolta-Jael in Santiago de Compostela.

Routine music information

References 

2007 births
Living people
Israeli rhythmic gymnasts
Medalists at the Rhythmic Gymnastics European Championships